Carlos Stricker (born 2 October 1937) is an Argentine modern pentathlete. He competed at the 1960 Summer Olympics.

References

External links
 

1937 births
Living people
Argentine male modern pentathletes
Olympic modern pentathletes of Argentina
Modern pentathletes at the 1960 Summer Olympics
People from Castellanos Department
Sportspeople from Santa Fe Province